United Nations Security Council Resolution 282, adopted on July 23, 1970, concerned by violations of the arms embargo passed against South Africa in Resolution 191, the Council reiterated its total opposition to the policies of apartheid and reaffirmed its previous resolutions on the topic.  The Council called upon states to strengthen the arms embargo by ceasing the provision of military training to members of the South African armed forces and by taking appropriate action to give effective to the resolution's measures.

The resolution was adopted with 12 votes; France, Spain, the United Kingdom, and the United States abstained from voting.

See also
List of United Nations Security Council Resolutions 201 to 300 (1965–1971)
South Africa under apartheid
United Nations Security Council Resolution 418

References

External links
 
Text of the Resolution at undocs.org

 0282
 0282
1970 in South Africa
July 1970 events